Salvador Sánchez Castro (born 20 September 1985) is a Mexican professional boxer and nephew of boxing legend Salvador Sánchez.

Professional career
His first two fights were losses to undefeated boxers but has won 30 of his next 38 since then, winning the WBC CABOFE featherweight title in 2011. Salvador is signed to Bob Arum's Top Rank promotions.

See also
Notable boxing families

References

External links

1985 births
Boxers from the State of Mexico
Featherweight boxers
Living people
Mexican male boxers